N.Y.P.D. is a half-hour American police crime drama television series of the 1960s set in the context of the New York City Police Department. The program appeared on the ABC network during the 1967–1968 and 1968–1969 United States network television schedules. The program appeared in the evening, 9:30 p.m. time slot. During the second season, N.Y.P.D was joined by The Mod Squad and It Takes a Thief to form a 2½ hour block of crime dramas.

Plot
N.Y.P.D. centers around three New York police detectives – Lt. Mike Haines (Jack Warden), Detective Jeff Ward (Robert Hooks), and Detective Johnny Corso (Frank Converse) – who fight a wide range of crimes and criminals. The show features many real New York City locations, as well as episodes based on actual New York City police cases.

Cast
 Jack Warden as Lt. Mike Haines
 Robert Hooks as Det. Jeff Ward
 Frank Converse as Det. Johnny Corso
 Ted Beniades as Det. Richie
 Denise Nicholas as Ethel
 Tom Rosqui as Det. Jacobs

Production

Development
The show was a production of Talent Associates, Ltd., a company founded by Alfred Levy and David Susskind. Talent Associates had produced 14 years of the anthology program Armstrong Circle Theatre and The Kaiser Aluminum Hour, both highly respected shows. Television producer, movie producer, and talk show host Susskind created N.Y.P.D. with screenwriter Arnold Perl (Cotton Comes to Harlem).

At the time of his death in 1971, Arnold Perl was working on a screenplay about assassinated black activist Malcolm X, which would later become the basis for Spike Lee's 1992 film, Malcolm X. Daniel Melnick, the show's executive producer, was a partner with Susskind in Talent Associates and had brought Mel Brooks and Buck Henry together to create the TV comedy Get Smart in 1965. Producer Susskind and actor Harvey Keitel would work together again on Martin Scorsese's Alice Doesn't Live Here Anymore (1974). Scripted by writers like Lonne Elder, who would later be the first African-American nominated for a Best Screenplay Oscar (for 1972's Sounder), the stories came with such titles as "Cruise to Oblivion," "Which Side Are You On?," "The Screaming Woman," and "Deadly Circle of Violence."

In N.Y.P.D. scripts, there were white cops and black cops, white suspects and black suspects, white witnesses and black witnesses, an unselfconscious racial blend that would not otherwise be seen for several years on U.S. network television (Room 222 and Hawaii Five-O were among the next series to feature casts situated similarly.)

Casting
Among the actors who appeared in the series were Rutanya Alda, Jane Alexander, Conrad Bain, Philip Bosco, John Cazale, Leslie Charleson, Miriam Colon, Franklin Cover, Matthew Cowles, Blythe Danner, Ossie Davis, Howard Da Silva, Mary Fickett, Scott Glenn, Charles Grodin, Moses Gunn, Graham Jarvis, James Earl Jones, Raul Julia, Marcia Jean Kurtz, Laurence Luckinbill, Nancy Marchand, Bill Macy, Donna McKechnie, Meg Myles, Priscilla Pointer, Andrew Robinson, Esther Rolle, Martin Sheen, Jon Voight, Richard Ward, Louis Zorich, Al Pacino,  Jill Clayburgh, Jane Elliot, Ralph Waite, Harvey Keitel, James Earl Jones, Charles Durning, Gretchen Corbett, and Roy Scheider.

Writing
In 1967, N.Y.P.D. was the first television series in America to air an episode with a Homosexual theme ("Shakedown"). The police track down a man blackmailing Homosexual men, prompting several suicides.

Opening credits
The series' opening credit sequence, prominently featuring a closeup of a police car emergency light as the vehicle drives through the streets of New York, would later be spoofed in the 1980s comedy series Police Squad! and subsequent movies.

Episodes

Season 1 (1967–68)

Season 2 (1968–69)

External links

  
 The Robert J. Markell papers, 1967–1968 are located in the Northeastern University Libraries, Archives and Special Collections Department, Boston, MA.

1967 American television series debuts
1969 American television series endings
American Broadcasting Company original programming
1960s American crime drama television series
English-language television shows
Fictional portrayals of the New York City Police Department
Television series by CBS Studios
Television series by Talent Associates
American detective television series